Charles Roderick Fraser (born 1907, date of death unknown) was an English professional footballer, who spent his entire career with Luton Town.

Career

After playing youth football for his local club Fairbairn House, Fraser signed for Luton Town in 1926. Making 270 appearances in nine years with the club, Fraser left the club in 1935.

References

1907 births
English footballers
English Football League players
Luton Town F.C. players
Year of death missing
Association football defenders
Footballers from Plaistow, Newham